Henry Bull may refer to:

 Henry Bull (theologian) (died 1577), English Protestant writer
 Henry Bull (MP) (1630–1692), English Member of Parliament
 Henry Bull (settler) (1799–c. 1848), British Royal Navy officer and pioneer settler of the Swan River Colony in Australia
 Henry Bull (governor) (1610–1694), Governor of Rhode Island, 1685–86, 1690
 Henrik Johan Bull (1844–1930), known as Henry Bull, Norwegian businessman and shipping magnate

See also
Henry Bull House, Newport, Rhode Island